Lonnie Johnson Jr. (born November 4, 1995) is an American football cornerback for the Tennessee Titans of the National Football League (NFL). He played college football at Kentucky.

Early years
Johnson attended West Side Leadership Academy in Gary, Indiana. He originally committed to Ohio State University to play college football, but decommitted and went to San Bernardino Valley College. Johnson later transferred to Garden City Community College.

College career
Johnson attended San Bernardino Valley College in 2014 and played wide receiver and special teams. 
He attended Garden City in 2015 and 2016, but did not play in 2016 to concentrate on academics. He transferred to the University of Kentucky in 2017. In two seasons at Kentucky, he had 64 tackles and one interception.

Professional career

Houston Texans
Johnson was drafted by the Houston Texans in the second round, 54th overall, of the 2019 NFL Draft.
The Texans previously acquired the 54th overall pick from the Seattle Seahawks in a trade that sent Duane Brown to Seattle. On May 10, 2019, he signed his rookie contract.

In the Divisional Round of the playoffs against the Kansas City Chiefs, Johnson recovered a blocked punt and returned it for a 25-yard touchdown during the 51–31 loss, but his ineffectiveness in covering Chiefs tight end Travis Kelce, in part due to an injury sustained mid-game, was cited as one of the primary reasons for the Chiefs' historic comeback win.

Kansas City Chiefs
On May 2, 2022, Johnson was traded to the Kansas City Chiefs for a 2024 conditional seventh-round pick. He was waived on August 15, 2022.

Tennessee Titans 
Johnson was claimed off waivers by the Tennessee Titans on August 16, 2022. He was placed on injured reserve on November 17, 2022. He was activated from injured reserve a month later.

References

External links
Kentucky Wildcats bio
Garden City CC bio

1995 births
Living people
Players of American football from Gary, Indiana
American football safeties
American football cornerbacks
Garden City Broncbusters football players
Kentucky Wildcats football players
Houston Texans players
Kansas City Chiefs players
Tennessee Titans players